In mathematics, the Kervaire semi-characteristic, introduced by , is an invariant of closed manifolds M of dimension  taking values in , given by 

.

 showed that the Kervaire semi-characteristic of a differentiable manifold is given by the index of a skew-adjoint elliptic operator.

Assuming M is oriented, the Atiyah vanishing theorem states that if M has two linearly independent vector fields, then .

References

Notes

Differential topology